Bryan Cook (born September 7, 1999) is an American football safety for the Kansas City Chiefs of the National Football League (NFL). He played college football at Howard before transferring to Cincinnati.

Early life and high school
Cook grew up in Cincinnati, Ohio and attended Mount Healthy High School in Mount Healthy, Ohio. As a senior, he was named first-team All-Southwest Ohio Conference after recording 35 tackles, three interceptions, and a fumble recovery in nine games on defense and catching four passes for 110 yards and three touchdowns on offense. Cook was lightly recruited and committed to play college football at Howard University, which was his only scholarship offer.

College career
Cook began his collegiate career playing for the Howard Bison. He played in 21 games at cornerback over two seasons for Howard and had 93 tackles, five tackles for a loss, two forced fumbles, and two fumble recoveries, with 17 passes defended and five interceptions, one of which he returned for a 41-yard touchdown. After his sophomore season, Cook entered the NCAA transfer portal and transferred to continue his collegiate career at University of Cincinnati.

Cook sat out the regular season of his first year with the Cincinnati Bearcats per NCAA transfer rules. During his redshirt year he was moved from cornerback to safety. Cook played in the 2020 Birmingham Bowl following the end of the regular season. He had 26 tackles with two passes broken up in his first full season at Cincinnati. As a senior, Cook 96 tackles, five tackles for loss, and one sack with 9 passes defended and two interceptions and was named first-team All-American Athletic Conference.

Professional career

Cook was drafted by the Kansas City Chiefs in the second round, 62nd overall, of the 2022 NFL Draft. In the AFC Championship Game, Cook deflected a pass to teammate Joshua Williams with score tied at 20. It helped the Chiefs defeat the Cincinnati Bengals 23-20 to reach Super Bowl LVII. In the Super Bowl, Cook had 1 tackle in the Chiefs 38-35 win over where the Philadelphia Eagles.

References

External links
 Kansas City Chiefs bio
Howard Bison bio
Cincinnati Bearcats bio

Living people
Cincinnati Bearcats football players
Howard Bison football players
Players of American football from Cincinnati
American football safeties
Kansas City Chiefs players
1999 births